Spadella is a genus of worms belonging to the family Spadellidae.

The species of this genus are found in Europe, Northern America, Pacific Ocean.

Species

Species:

Spadella angulata 
Spadella antarctica 
Spadella birostrata

References

Chaetognatha